This is a list of broadcast television stations that are licensed in the U.S. state of Maryland.

Full-power stations
VC refers to the station's PSIP virtual channel. RF refers to the station's physical RF channel.

Defunct full-power stations
Channel 24: WMET-TV - Ind. - Baltimore (3/1/1967-1/17/1972)

LPTV stations

Cable TV channels
Mid-Atlantic Sports Network (MASN) - Regional sports network
NBC Sports Washington - Regional sports network.
WJLA 24/7 News - Local Cable TV News station for Washington DC, Maryland and Virginia suburbs

Defunct
CN8 - News network owned by Comcast.

See also
List of television stations in Washington, D.C.
 Maryland media
 List of newspapers in Maryland
 List of radio stations in Maryland
 Media of locales in Maryland: Baltimore, College Park, Cumberland, Frederick, Gaithersburg

Bibliography

External links
  (Directory ceased in 2017)
 Maryland, DC, Delaware Broadcasters Association

Maryland

Television stations